Fehmi Naji El-Imam AM (1928- 24 September 2016)  was the Grand Mufti of Australia from June 2007 to September 2011. Born in Lebanon, he arrived in Australia in 1951.  He was elected to succeed Taj El-Din Hilaly on 10 June 2007, but by January 2011 Hilaly declared that Naji was no longer active, and that de facto he was functioning as mufti.  Naji was succeeded on 18 September 2011 by Ibrahim Abu Mohamed.

Naji questioned Osama bin Laden's responsibility for the September 11 attacks. He was the Head Imam of Preston Mosque in Melbourne and secretary of the Victorian Board of Imams.

He died of natural causes on 24 September 2016.

Activities
Naji served as a board member on the Muslim Community Reference Group, an advisory board established by the Howard Government from 2005 to 2006.

References

External links 
 The Sheikh of Melbourne Transcript of ABC TV programme (2001)

1928 births
2016 deaths
Members of the Order of Australia
Recipients of the Centenary Medal
Lebanese emigrants to Australia
Australian Sunni Muslim scholars of Islam
Australian imams
Grand Muftis of Australia